Nemapogon palmella is a moth of the family Tineidae. It is found on the Canary Islands and in North Africa, where it has been recorded from Morocco.

References

Moths described in 1908
Nemapogoninae